Debark or debarking may refer to:

Debark (ship), to leave or offload a ship
Debarking, devocalization of dogs to reduce the volume of their barking sound
Debarking (lumber), removing bark from lumber

See also

Debarq, a town in Ethiopia
Embarkment (disambiguation)
Girdling, i.e. ring-barking